Endotricha albicilia is a species of snout moth in the genus Endotricha. It was described by George Hampson in 1891, and is known from India, Sri Lanka and the Andamans.

References

Endotrichini
Moths described in 1891